Ham Green may refer to several places in England:

 Ham Green, North Somerset, a hamlet
 Ham Green, Wiltshire, a hamlet
 Ham Green, Worcestershire, a hamlet near Redditch